Led Zeppelin were an English rock band who recorded 108 songs between 1968 and 1980. The band pioneered the concept of album-oriented rock and often refused to release popular songs as singles, instead viewing their albums as indivisible, complete listening experiences, and disliked record labels re-editing their songs for single releases.

Their self-titled debut album, Led Zeppelin, released in early 1969, contained songs that were influenced by the genres of blues, hard rock and heavy metal. Led Zeppelin II, released in October 1969, built upon their debut with a more direct, hard-hitting sound that has become a blueprint for heavy metal bands. Led Zeppelin III (1970) marked a musical growth for the band; half of its songs were hard rockers while the other half were built upon folk and acoustic music that gave it "extra depth". "Immigrant Song", released as a single, was backed by the band's only non-album single, "Hey, Hey, What Can I Do". Their untitled fourth album, commonly referred to as Led Zeppelin IV, was released in November 1971. Bringing together all the genres from their previous albums, the album contains some of the band's best-known songs, including "Black Dog", "Rock and Roll", "Going to California" and "Stairway to Heaven", referred to as one of the greatest rock songs of all time.

The band's following albums, Houses of the Holy (1973) and Physical Graffiti (1975), continued the band's musical growth. Houses of the Holy contained a wider range of musical styles, from the ballad "The Rain Song" to the funk-inspired "The Crunge", while Physical Graffiti was a double album that contained new songs as well as unreleased outtakes from previous albums. The album, like its predecessor, contained a variety of musical styles, including hard rock, funk, acoustic rock, blues, soft and progressive rock, and even country rock. Presence (1976) marked a departure from their previous albums by featuring more straightforward, guitar-driven songs with less emphasis on musical experimentation. In Through the Out Door (1979), a direct contrast to Presence, featured a keyboard-heavy sound that was dominated by Jones. The album would prove to be their last as a band, as after Bonham's death in September 1980, the remaining members decided to disband the group. Coda (1982) is a collection of outtakes from various sessions during the band's career.

Since their breakup, 26 songs have seen official release. The Led Zeppelin Boxed Set (1990) saw the release of the band's cover of Robert Johnson's "Travelling Riverside Blues", the live medley "White Summer/Black Mountain Side", and the first album release of "Hey, Hey, What Can I Do?"; the second boxed set (1993) saw the release of "Baby Come On Home". New songs were also released on BBC Sessions (1997) and its remaster, The Complete BBC Sessions (2015), 2003's Led Zeppelin DVD and the live album How the West Was Won (2003). After the release of the concert film Celebration Day (2012), Page announced the remastering of the band's discography in the form of deluxe editions, which together included 13 previously unreleased songs, some of which were different mixes of previously released songs. The albums were released between 2014 and 2015.

Songs

Notes

References

Bibliography

External links
 Led Zeppelin discography

 
British music-related lists
Led Zeppelin